The 1995 African Junior Athletics Championships was the second edition of the biennial, continental athletics tournament for African athletes aged 19 years or younger. It was held in Bouaké, Ivory Coast, from 20–22 July. A total of 36 events were contested, 19 by men and 17 by women.

Agnes Afiyo of Ghana, the runner-up in the women's javelin throw, was determined to be male in 1999 following medical testing. It is not known whether the medals from this competition were reassigned as a result.

Medal table

Medal summary

Men

Women

References

Results
African Junior Championships 1995. World Junior Athletics History. Retrieved on 2013-10-13.

African Junior Athletics Championships
African U20 Championships
Athletics competitions in Ivory Coast
You
African Junior Athletics
Bouaké
Sport in Vallée du Bandama District
International sports competitions hosted by Ivory Coast
1995 in youth sport